Rockenbach is a surname. Notable people with this surname include:

Anneliese Rockenbach (born 1943), Venezuelan swimmer
Lyle Rockenbach (1915–2005), American football player
Samuel Rockenbach (1869–1952), American Brigadier General and father of the United States Tank Corps
Thiago Rockenbach (born 1985), Brazilian football player